The 2020–21 Mount St. Mary's Mountaineers men's basketball team represented Mount St. Mary's University during the 2020–21 NCAA Division I men's basketball season. The Mountaineers were led by third-year head coach Dan Engelstad, and played their home games at Knott Arena in Emmitsburg, Maryland as members of the Northeast Conference. They finished the season 12-11, 9-7 in NEC Play to finish in 4th place. They defeated Wagner and Bryant to be champions of the NEC tournament. They received the conference’s automatic bid to the NCAA tournament where they lost in the First Four to Texas Southern.

Previous season
The Mountaineers finished their previous season 11–21, 7–11 in NEC play to finish in a three-way tie for seventh place. They lost in the quarterfinals of the NEC tournament to Sacred Heart.

Roster

Schedule and results

|-
!colspan=12 style=| Non-Conference Regular season

|-
!colspan=12 style=| NEC tournament
|-

|-
!colspan=12 style=| NCAA tournament
|-

Source

References

Mount St. Mary's Mountaineers men's basketball seasons
Mount St. Mary's Mountaineers
Mount St. Mary's Mountaineers men's basketball team
Mount St. Mary's Mountaineers men's basketball team
Mount St. Mary's